Nineties vs. Eighties is the debut EP and first major release by American post-hardcore band Girls Against Boys, released in 1990 by Adult Swim Records. Both sides of the EP features a different lineup of the band, and as a result, a different sound. The first side ("Nineties") represents the direction that the band would take in the ensuing years.

Track listing

Personnel 
Adapted from the Nineties vs. Eighties liner notes.

 Girls Against Boys
 Brendan Canty – drums (4-6), organ (4-6)
 Alexis Fleisig – drums (1-3)
 Eli Janney – sampler, bass guitar (1-3), engineering
 Scott McCloud – lead vocals, guitar
 Johnny Temple – bass guitar (1-3)

Production and additional personnel
 Girls Against Boys – production
 Amy Pickering – vocals (5)

Release history

References

External links 
 

1990 debut EPs
Girls Against Boys albums